Oahuan may refer to:
A person from the Hawaiian island of Oahu
The Punahou School (9-12) student yearbook The Oahuan